Elizabeth "Elly" Dammers (15 August 1921 – 3 January 2009) was a Dutch javelin thrower. She competed at the 1948 Summer Olympics and finished in 8th place.

References

1921 births
2009 deaths
Athletes (track and field) at the 1948 Summer Olympics
Dutch female javelin throwers
Olympic athletes of the Netherlands
Athletes from Amsterdam